Frederick Casimir (10 June 1585 – 30 September 1645) was the Duke of Landsberg from 1604 until 1645.

Life
Frederick was born in Zweibrücken in 1585 as the second son of John I, Count Palatine of Zweibrücken and Magdalene of Jülich-Cleves-Berg. After his father's death in 1604, Frederick Casimir and his brothers partitioned his territories; Frederick Casimir received the territory around Landsberg in Alsace.

In 1611 his late father's dispositions in his favour and that of his younger brother, Johann Casimir, were finally implemented, giving them, respectively, the appanages of Landsberg and Neukastell, reserving for their eldest brother most of Palatine Zweibrücken.  He died in Montfort-en-Auxois in 1645 and is buried alongside other counts/dukes of the house's line, in the crypt of Alexander's Church in Zweibrücken, built in 1493 by his ancestor Alexander, Count Palatine of Zweibrücken.

Family
Frederick Casimir married Countess Emilia Antwerpiana of Nassau (9 December 1581 – 28 September 1657), a daughter of William the Silent, Prince of Orange, on 4 July 1616 and had Frederick Louis, Count Palatine of Zweibrücken (27 October 1619 – 11 April 1681), his heir.

Ancestors

References

House of Palatinate-Zweibrücken
Palatinate-Landsberg, Frederick Casimir
Palatinate-Landsberg, Frederick Casimir
Burials at the Alexanderkirche, Zweibrücken